1996 in the Philippines details events of note that happened in the Philippines in the year 1996.

Incumbents

 President: Fidel Ramos (Lakas)
 Vice President: Joseph Estrada (NPC)
 Senate President
Neptali Gonzales (until October 10)
Ernesto Maceda (starting October 10)
 House Speaker: Jose de Venecia, Jr.
 Chief Justice: Andres Narvasa
 Philippine Congress: 10th Congress of the Philippines

Events

January
 January 22 – A Philippine Navy gunboat engages in a battle with three Chinese naval vessels near Mischief Reef in the Spratly Islands, marking the first violent military confrontation involving the two countries and further triggering an ongoing diplomatic crisis.

February
 February 14 – Violent clashes erupt between Filipino soldiers and Vietnamese boat people, as the Philippines government attempts to forcibly repatriate hundreds of Vietnamese asylum seekers.
 February 18 – At least 50 people were killed when an overcrowded ferry capsized at the entrance to the port of Cadiz, Negros Occidental; the incident happened when passengers shifted to one side to avoid high waves.

March
 March 18 – Fire razes Ozone Disco in Quezon City, killing 162 guests including college graduating students and 95 more injured. The incident was officially acknowledged as the worst fire in Philippine history, and among the 10 worst nightclub fires in the world.
 March 24 – A mining disaster occurs in the island province of Marinduque when the leftover mine tailings from the drainage of the Marcopper Mining Corporation are leaked into the river and spilled into the sea.

June
 June 13 – Retired P/Col. Rolando Abadilla, intelligence officer during the Marcos administration, is assassinated in Quezon City. Communist Alex Boncayao Brigade claims responsibility. Five of the seven accused would be convicted in 1999.

July
 July 24–25 – Typhoon Gloria loosed rains and flooding that killed nearly 60 people on Luzon and Mindoro Islands.
 July 31 – Sarah Balabagan, a migrant worker sentenced and imprisoned in the United Arab Emirates for almost two years for killing her employer in self-defense, is freed; will return to the country the next day.

August
 August 1 – Mabuhay, moved to its new orbital slot. Mabuhay satellite, previously named Palapa B-2P, was acquired by Mabuhay Philippines Satellite Corporation on an earlier date this year. Mabuhay became one to be owned by a Filipino entity.
 August 10 – Sagay becomes a city in the province of Negros Occidental through ratification of Republic Act 8192 which was approved last June 11.

September
 September 2 – A permanent peace agreement is signed at the Malacañan Palace between the Government of the Philippines and the Moro National Liberation Front.

November
 November 24–25 – 8th Asia-Pacific Economic Cooperation (APEC) Summit is held in Subic, Zambales; the first time the country hosted the event.

December
 December 7 – Marikina becomes a highly urbanized city in Metro Manila through ratification of Republic Act 8223 which was approved last November 6.

Holidays

As per Executive Order No. 292, chapter 7 section 26, the following are regular holidays and special days, approved on July 25, 1987. Note that in the list, holidays in bold are "regular holidays" and those in italics are "nationwide special days".

 January 1 – New Year's Day
 April 4 – Maundy Thursday
 April 5 – Good Friday
 April 9 – Araw ng Kagitingan (Day of Valor)
 May 1 – Labor Day
 June 12 – Independence Day 
 August 25 – National Heroes Day
 November 1 –  All Saints Day
 November 30 – Bonifacio Day
 December 25 – Christmas Day
 December 30 – Rizal Day
 December 31 – Last Day of the Year

In addition, several other places observe local holidays, such as the foundation of their town. These are also "special days."

Television

Sports
 May 26 – The Alaska Milkmen defeated the Purefoods TJ Hotdogs, 93-92 in overtime to win the 1996 PBA All-Filipino Cup Finals.
 July 19–August 4 – The Philippines participated in the 1996 Summer Olympics in Atlanta, Georgia, United States and ranked 61st. Athlete Mansueto Velasco received his silver medal and placed second in boxing.
 September 10 – The Alaska Milkmen won against the Formula Shell Zoom Masters, grabbing their second championship for the season.
 December 17 – The Alaska Milkmen has won the coveted grandslam, winning the series over Ginebra San Miguel, 4-1.

Concerts
 December 8–10 – Michael Jackson HIStory World Tour: Asiaworld City, Parañaque

Births
 January 3 – Baninay Bautista, actress and internet sensation
 January 4 – Joshua Colet, actor and model
 January 6 – Elisse Joson, actress and model
 January 9 – Robilyn "Rob" Guinto, actress, model, and social media influencer
 January 10 – Joshua Pacio, mixed martial artist and former MMA World Champion
 January 15 – Julian Estrada, actor
 January 21
 Hannah Arnold, beauty queen
 Tukomi, social media influencers and comedians
 January 22 – Khalil Ramos, actor and singer
 February 15 – Skusta Clee, rapper, member of Ex Battalion
 February 18 – Elle Villanueva, actress and model
 March 7 – Angelica Barcelo, actress and TV host
 March 16 - Kaila Estrada, actress
 March 22 – Jan Capon, actor
 March 26 – Kathryn Bernardo, actress
 April 2 – Kib Montalbo, basketball player
 April 3 – DJ Loonyo, vlogger
 April 12 – Charlie Dizon, actress 
 April 20 – Miggy Tolentino, actor and That's My Bae contestant
 May 10 – Anjo Damiles, actor
 May 13 – Bruno Gabriel, actor
 May 21 – Jay Arcilla, actor
 June 1
 Nikki Co, actor
 Dawn Macandili, volleyball player
 June 2 – Morissette, singer, songwriter, and actress
 June 3 – Prince de Guzman, make up artist and vlogger 
 June 9 – Marvelous Alejo, actress and singer
 June 30 – JM Yosures, Tawag ng Tanghalan season 4 champion
 July 20 – Sue Ramirez, actress
 July 22 – Jane Oineza, actress
 July 23 – Viy Cortez, vlogger
 July 28 – Yasser Marta, actor
 August 3 – Anikka Dela Cruz, actress
 August 9 – Sanya Lopez, actress
 August 13 – Thea Tolentino, actress
 August 15: 
 Analyn Barro, actress
 Chienna Filomeno, actress
 Flow G, rapper
 August 17:
 Ella Cruz, actress
 Kyo Quijano, vlogger
 August 19 – Hannah Precillas, singer
 August 24 – Faye Lorenzo, actress
 September 4 – Sisi Rondina, volleyball player
 September 6 – Royce Cabrera, actor
 September 8 – Krystal Reyes, actress and vlogger
 September 13 – CJ Navato, actor
 September 24 – Gigi De Lana, actress and singer
 September 27 - Remedy Rule, swimmer
 October 17 – Karen Reyes, actress
 October 26 – Ronnie Alonte, actor and singer
 November 4 – Michael Christian Martinez, figure skater
 November 7 – Luke Gebbie, swimmer
 November 11 – Mimiyuuuh, vlogger
 November 14 – Rabiya Mateo, actress, model and beauty pageant titleholder
 November 16 – Zamierre Benevice, actress, model
 December 13 – Jenelyn Olsim, mixed martial artist
 December 17 – Thirdy Ravena, basketball player
 December 22:
 Makisig Morales, actor and singer
 Joao Constancia, actor and member of BoybandPH
 December 25 – Ivana Alawi, actress and vlogger

Deaths
 January 7 – Bienvenido Santos, Filipino-American fiction, poetry and nonfiction writer. (b. 1911)
 March 17 – Rey Cuenco, basketball player (b. 1960)
 June 2 – Ishmael Bernal, Filipino film, stage and television director, actor and screenwriter (b. 1938)
 June 13 – Rolando Abadilla, intelligence officer during the Marcos regime (b. 1942)
 August 11 – Ambrosio Padilla, basketball player and senator (b. 1910)
 September 18 – Tomás Cloma, lawyer and businessman (b. 1904)
 October 17 – Richie Fernando, S.J., Filipino Jesuit cleric and missionary (b. 1970)
 October 28 – Irene R. Cortes, Filipino judge (b. 1921)
 November 2 – Arnie Tuadles, basketball player (b. 1956)
 November 27 – Balot, comedian, film, television and stage actor (b. 1926)
 December 28 – Tenten Muñoz, singer and actress (b. 1977)

References

 
1996 in Southeast Asia
Philippines
1990s in the Philippines
Years of the 20th century in the Philippines